The Théâtre de la Porte Saint-Martin is a venerable theatre and opera house at 18, Boulevard Saint-Martin in the 10th arrondissement of Paris.

History  
The new theatre had a capacity of about 2,000 spectators and included a parterre with the lowest-priced tickets sold only to males who stood throughout the performances, an amphitheatre, and four rows of boxes. The Opéra used the theatre from 27 October 1781 until August 1794.

The theatre was destroyed by fire during the Paris Commune of 1871 and replaced in 1873 with a building designed by the architect Oscar de la Chardonnière (d. 1881), who enlisted the aid of the sculptor Jacques-Hyacinthe Chevalier (1825–1895) in the design of the new facade. The new interior was designed by H. Chevalier.  With relatively brief interruptions, the theatre has been in continuous operation since.

Premieres
 1783: La caravane du Caire, opéra-ballet in three acts by André Grétry
 1787: Tarare, opéra (tragédie lyrique) by Antonio Salieri
 1806: Ramire, ou le fils naturel, melodrama in 3 acts by Philippe Jacques de La Roche, music by Francesco Bianchi.
 1818: Les Deux Colons, a one-act play interspersed with verses by Joseph Aude and James Harvey D'Egville
 1841: Les Farfadets, a "ballet-féerie" by Auguste Pilati
 1849: Le Postillon de Saint-Valéry, opéra-comique by Auguste Pilati
 1849: Le pasteur, ou l’evangile et le foyer, a play by Émile Souvestre and Eugène Bourgeois
 1874: a stage version of Jules Verne's Around the World in Eighty Days, adapted by Verne and Adolphe d'Ennery, which ran 415 performances (before its subsequent very long run at the Théâtre du Châtelet)
 1880: L'Arbre de Noël, operetta by Alexandre Charles Lecocq and Georges Jacobi
 1887: La Tosca, written by Victorien Sardou for Sarah Bernhardt, with a hugely successful first run of 200 performances
 1897: the original Cyrano de Bergerac, the best-known work of Edmond Rostand, with Benoît-Constant Coquelin in the title role 
 1907: The Affair of the Poisons, final play by Victorien Sardou
 1914: Monsieur Brotonneau, play by Gaston Arman de Caillavet and Robert de Flers

Three of the above were the basis of opera libretti:
 Verdi's Stiffelio was based on Le pasteur, ou l’evangile et le foyer
 Puccini's Tosca was based on La Tosca
 Alfano's Cyrano de Bergerac was based on Cyrano de Bergerac

The theatre's other productions have included the ballet Leda, the Swiss Milkmaid (1823) and works by Dany Boon, Charles-Gaspard Delestre-Poirson and Gaston Arman de Caillavet.

See also
Suzanne Lagier

References

External links

 Official web site.
 Facade of the current theatre. Google Maps street view at 18, boulevard Saint-Martin.

Theatres in the 10th arrondissement of Paris
Porte Saint-Martin
Porte Saint-Martin
1781 establishments in France
Theatres completed in 1781
18th-century architecture in France